Where Do We Go from Here?  is an album of duets by flugelhornist Kenny Wheeler with pianist John Taylor recorded in 2004 and released on the CAM Jazz label.

Reception

The AllMusic review by Scott Yanow states "Wheeler and Taylor often echo each other's thoughts and, although much of the music is melancholy and ballad-oriented, it never gets sleepy or overly predictable. The two musicians operate as equals and consistently uncover quiet beauty in these pieces. This outing is well worth exploring by those who are patient and listen closely".

On All About Jazz, John Kelman noted "What makes Where Do We Go From Here? such an outstanding recording is the remarkable empathy between Wheeler and Taylor. Years of performing together will typically build a good chemistry between capable players, but Wheeler and Taylor go beyond mere comfort into a level of telepathy that finds them completely attuned to each other. The two are so much a part of each other's playing that the smallest nuance, the tiniest phrase from one can spark a response from the other that moves things in another unexpected direction. Yet their responses to each other are so subtle, so graceful, that these unpredictable shifts feel completely natural, smooth and seamless".

The Guardian 's John Fordham noted "Wheeler balances idiosyncratic melodic journeys with shrewdly placed accents and his trademark falsetto squeal on the only imported piece (Summer Night), with Taylor first patrolling supportively around him, then launching into a solo flood of time-changes, percussive sounds, classical rhapsodies and ambiguous chords".

In JazzTimes, David R. Adler wrote "Recorded in Italy, the album doesn't do full sonic justice to these masters. The signal distorts in places (particularly on some of Wheeler's entrances), which is a problem with music this naked and unadorned. That said, the two display a rare chemistry on seven Wheeler originals, two Taylor pieces and an opening run-through of Dubin and Warren's "Summer Night" "

Track listing
All compositions by Kenny Wheeler except where noted.
 "Summer Night" (Harry Warren, Al Dubin) – 6:20
 "For Tracy" – 5:03
 "Ma Bel" – 5:01
 "Au Contraire" (John Taylor) – 4:31
 "Canter N. 1" – 5:25
 "Squiggles" – 5:56
 "One Two Three" – 6:44
 "Where Do We Go from Here?" – 5:12
 "Dance" (Taylor) – 3:38
 "Fordor" – 6:20

Personnel
 Kenny Wheeler – trumpet, flugelhorn
 John Taylor - piano

References

2004 albums
Kenny Wheeler albums
CAM Jazz albums
John Taylor (jazz) albums